This is a list of the heritage sites in Pietermaritzburg as recognized by the South African Heritage Resources Agency.

|}

References 

Tourist attractions in KwaZulu-Natal
Piermaritzburg
Heritage sites in Pieterm
Pietermaritzburg